Streamline is a 2021 Australian sports drama film written and directed by Tyson Wade Johnston. It marks his directorial debut. It was released on 19 August 2021 at the Melbourne International Film Festival (MIFF), and in theaters on 2 September 2021, by Umbrella Entertainment.

Synopsis 
Teenage swimmer Benjamin Lane faces problems after his father leaves jail.

Cast 
 Levi Miller as Benjamin Lane
 Jason Isaacs as Rob Bush

Production 
The film was sold at the American Film Market by Arclight Films. To build the character, Levi Miller consulted with Olympic swimming champion Ian Thorpe.

Reception 
On Rotten Tomatoes, the film has an approval rating of 75% based on 21 reviews, with an average rating of 6.6/10. 
Luke Buckmaster at The Guardian called the film "emotionally gripping swimming film that breaks the sports movie mould". Paul Byrnes at Sydney Morning Herald said that "the film grows muscles as it progresses, a bit like a swimmer in training, but it's too little too late."

In his review for The Curb, Andrew F. Peirce said that "Streamline is an impressive and towering achievement from Tyson Wade Johnston, one that will be earmarked as a turning point in Levi Miller's enduring career, a possible pivot point that will likely guide him towards more mature performances". Doug Jamieson, in his review for The Jam Report said that "this is one of the best Australian films of the year."

See also 
 Streamline (swimming)

References

External links 
 
 

2021 films
2021 drama films
2021 directorial debut films
Australian coming-of-age drama films
Films about Olympic swimming and diving
2020s English-language films
2020s Australian films
2020s coming-of-age drama films